Fantasy is the third single by R&B singer Danny Fernandes. It's the fourth track off his debut album Intro.

Music video
The music video first premiered on the MOD Daily Ten countdown on Much On Demand. It starts off with Fernandes sitting on a chair singing and looking at the camera, and later it shows a girl who just stands still in the middle of a hallway and thinks about her and Fernandes going on trips and spending time together. In the end part her and Fernandes are both in a bubble bath together, and the girl stops daydreaming after she was bumped into by another girl walking past her. Girlicious makes a cameo where they lip sync the hook "What's your fantasy". Danny's brother, Shawn Desman, also makes an appearance in the beginning of the music video. The whole entire video was choreographed by hip-hop choreographer Luther Brown, who's also one of the judges from So You Think You Can Dance Canada. The music video received a lot of commercial success as it also reached #1 on the Much Music Countdown

Chart performance
The song debuted at number 68 on the Canadian Hot 100 on the week of December 6, 2008. The song reached a new peak at number 25 on the week of February 14, 2009.

Certification

References

External links
 

2008 singles
CP Music Group singles
Danny Fernandes songs
Songs written by Belly (rapper)
2008 songs
Songs written by DaHeala
Songs written by Danny Fernandes